The Trenton Reds were a Minor League Baseball team that played in the Class D Kentucky–Illinois–Tennessee League in 1922. They were located in Trenton, Tennessee. The Reds opened the season at home with a 4–2 win over the Cairo Egyptians on May 16. The season ended on September 4 with Trenton losing both games of a doubleheader at Cairo, 8–7 and 5–4. They compiled an even 56–56 (.500) record in their only season of competition, finished in fifth place, and failed to win either half of the league's split season.

References

External links
Statistics from Baseball-Reference

1922 establishments in Tennessee
1922 disestablishments in Tennessee
Baseball teams established in 1922
Baseball teams disestablished in 1922
Defunct baseball teams in Tennessee
Defunct minor league baseball teams
Kentucky-Illinois-Tennessee League teams
Professional baseball teams in Tennessee